Shailesh Lodha (born 8 November 1969) is an Indian poet, actor, comedian and writer. He is best known for portraying Taarak Mehta in the Hindi sitcom Taarak Mehta Ka Ooltah Chashmah.

Personal life
Lodha was born in Jodhpur in a Marwari family. Lodha is married to a management author, Swati Lodha, and has a daughter Swara. Since his father was transferred to different places, Lodha travelled a lot. His mother loved reading and had a good vocabulary in Hindi. At the age of nine, Lodha was nicknamed "Baal Kavi". He had an office job, but he left it to follow his passion, i.e. writing poems. In a 2015 interview Lodha said, "I am half Jain".

Lodha has completed B.Sc. and PG in marketing.

Career
[[File:Cast-of-Taarak-Mehta-Ka-Ooltah-Chashmah-celebrate-the-12-year-anniversary-of-the-show.jpg|thumb|Shailesh Lodha at 12 years anniversary of Taarak Mehta Ka Ooltah Chashmah show]]

Lodha first appeared on Comedy Circus as a contestant, and later in Comedy ka Mahamukabla. He portrayed Taarak Mehta in the sitcom series Taarak Mehta Ka Ooltah Chashmah from 2008 to 2022.

Lodha was the main presenter in the TV program Wah! Wah! Kya Baat Hai! telecasted on SAB TV during 2012-13. In 2019, he appeared in the comedy film Wig Boss along with Sunil Pal and Rakhi Sawant.

Filmography
Television

 Author 
Lodha has written four books: the first two are satirical humour; the third is a self-help book co-written with his wife; and his most recent book, Diljale Ka Facebook Status, is a collection of poems written from the point of view of a jilted lover.

Awards for contribution to poetry or literature
 National Srijan Award
 Awarded by International Vaish Federation
 Bharat Gaurav
 Rajasthan Gaurav

 TV awards
 2014 – Zee Gold Awards (Best Anchor'')
 2018 – Zee Gold Awards (Best Actor in Comic Role) [Male]

References

External links

Living people
Indian male television actors
Indian humorists
Indian stand-up comedians
Indian male poets
Indian male comedians
Poets from Rajasthan
Male actors from Rajasthan
Indian television presenters
1969 births
People from Jodhpur